The Dengfeng Bridge is a historic stone arch bridge over the  in , Xiuning County, Anhui, China.

History

On 16 October 2019, it was listed among the eighth batch of "Major National Historical and Cultural Sites in Anhui" by the State Council of China.

References

Bridges in Anhui
Arch bridges in China
Bridges completed in 1791
Qing dynasty architecture
Buildings and structures completed in 1791
1791 establishments in China
Major National Historical and Cultural Sites in Anhui